The Archdiocese of Eger  is an archdiocese in Northern Hungary, its centre is the city of Eger.

History
 1000: Established as Diocese of Eger
 August 9, 1804: Promoted as Metropolitan Archdiocese of Eger

Ordinaries, in reverse chronogical order

Archbishops of Eger
 Csaba Ternyák (2007-present)
 István Seregély (1987-2007)
 László Kádár, O. Cist. (1978-1986)
 József Bánk (1974-1978)
 Pál Brezanóczy (1969-1972)
 Gyula Czapik (1943-1956)
 Lajos Szmrecsányi (1912-1943)
 József Samassa (1873-1912) (Cardinal in 1905)
 Béla Bartakovics (1850-?)
 Ladislaus Pyrker, O.Cist. (1827-1847)
 István Fisher (1807-1822)
 Ferenc Fuchs (1804-?)

Bishops of Eger
 Tamás Pálffy (1660-1678) 
 Benedict Kisdy (1648-1660)
 György Jakusics (1642-1647)
 György Lippay (1637-1642)
 István Szuhay (1600-1607)
 Antal Verancsics (1560-1573), appointed Archbishop of Esztergom (elevated to Cardinal in 1573) 
 Ferenc Ujlaky (1554-1555)
 Pál Várdai (1523-1526)
 Tamás Bakócz (1497-1497), appointed Archbishop of Esztergom and later Latin Patriarch of Constantinople (elevated to Cardinal in 1500)
 Ascanio Sforza (1492-1497)
 Johann Beckenschlager (1467-1474)
 Michael Szécsényi (1363-1377)
 Nicholas Dörögdi (1330–1361)
 Csanád Telegdi (1322–1330), appointed Archbishop of Esztergom
 Martin (1306–1322)
 Andrew (1275–1305)
 Lampert Hont-Pázmány (1245–1275)
 Cletus Bél (1224–1245)
 Thomas (1217–1224), appointed Archbishop of Esztergom
 Chama (1158–1166), appointed Archbishop of Kalocsa
 Lucas (1156–1158), appointed Archbishop of Esztergom
 Martyrius (1142–1150), appointed Archbishop of Esztergom

Suffragan dioceses
 Roman Catholic Diocese of Debrecen–Nyíregyháza
 Roman Catholic Diocese of Vác

See also
Roman Catholicism in Hungary

Sources
 GCatholic.org
 Catholic Hierarchy
 Diocese Website 
 Diocese Website

Roman Catholic dioceses in Hungary
Dioceses established in the 10th century
1000 establishments in Europe
10th-century establishments in Hungary
Religious organizations established in the 1000s
Eger
 
Eger